Seminole is an unincorporated community in Summers County, West Virginia, United States, located approximately  south of Hinton.

The community was named after the Seminole Indians.

References

Unincorporated communities in Summers County, West Virginia
Unincorporated communities in West Virginia